Fountain County lies in the western part of the U.S. state of Indiana on the east side of the Wabash River. The county was officially established in 1826 and was the 53rd in Indiana. The county seat is Covington.

According to the 2000 United States Census, its population was 17,954; the 2010 population was 17,240. The county has two incorporated cities and six incorporated towns with a total population of about 9,700, as well as many small unincorporated communities. It is divided into eleven townships which provide local services. An interstate highway, two U.S. Routes and five Indiana state roads cross the county, as does a major railroad line.

History
Indiana was granted statehood near the end of 1816. The first non-indigenous settler in the future Fountain County is thought to have been a Mr. Forbes, who arrived in early 1823 and was soon followed by others. The legislative act creating Fountain County was passed on December 30, 1825, setting an effective date of April 1, 1826. The county's boundaries have remained unchanged since that time. It was named for Major James Fontaine of Kentucky who was killed at Harmar's Defeat (near modern Fort Wayne, Indiana) on October 22, 1790, during the Northwest Indian War.

The first Fountain County courthouse was a two-story frame building constructed in Covington in 1827; Abraham Griffith submitted the winning bid of $335. In 1829, plans were made for a larger courthouse building, but then an act of the legislature called for the county seat to be moved. In the end it was decided that the county seat should remain in Covington, and the brick courthouse was completed in 1833. A third courthouse was commissioned in 1856, and was completed in 1857 at a cost of $33,500. The circuit court met for the first time in the new building in January 1860, and the building was largely destroyed by fire the same day. Isaac Hodgson was the architect for the rebuilt courthouse, which was first occupied in January 1861; the total cost, including the reconstruction, totaled $54,624.05. The current courthouse was built in 1936–37 at a cost of $246,734; it replaced the previous building which had been declared unsafe. The 1937 building was constructed by the Jacobson Brothers of Chicago; the architects were Louis R. Johnson and Walter Scholar of Lafayette. The courthouse walls display murals painted by Eugene Francis Savage and others from 1937 to 1940, covering  of wall space and depicting the settlement of western Indiana.

Digging on the Wabash and Erie Canal began in 1832 and worked southwest; it reached Lafayette by 1842. In 1846 it reached Covington, and by 1847 traffic was moving through the county via the canal. Completion of the county's first railroad line in the 1850s heralded an end to the canal's usefulness, and in 1875 the last canal boat passed through Covington.

The first railway line through the county was the Toledo, Wabash and Western Railway (later the Wabash Railroad) which was built from the east across the northern part of the county and reached Attica in 1856; it continued west through Warren County and reached the Illinois state line the following year. The Indianapolis, Crawfordsville and Danville Railroad (later the Indiana, Bloomington and Western Railway), was started in 1855, but the general state of the economy halted construction in 1858. It was completed by another owner in 1870, and traffic started in 1871. It passed through Covington, Veedersburg and Hillsboro.

Geography

Fountain County's northern and western borders are defined by the Wabash River which flows southwesterly out of Tippecanoe County.

The county is within the drainage basin of the Wabash River, sloping to the southwest. Approximately 84 percent of the county's land is use for agriculture.

The Portland Arch Nature Preserve and the Miller-Campbell Memorial Tract, a  preserve managed by the Indiana Department of Natural Resources, are located adjacent to the Wabash River.

Adjacent counties

 Warren County - north
 Tippecanoe County - northeast
 Montgomery County - east.
 Parke County - south
 Vermillion County - southwest

Communities

Cities
 Attica
 Covington (county seat)

Incorporated towns

 Hillsboro
 Kingman
 Mellott
 Newtown
 Veedersburg
 Wallace

Unincorporated communities

 Aylesworth
 Cates
 Centennial
 Coal Creek
 Fountain
 Graham
 Harveysburg
 Layton
 Riverside
 Rob Roy
 Roberts
 Silverwood
 Steam Corner
 Stone Bluff
 Vine
 Yeddo

Previous settlements
 Stringtown - abandoned mining settlement south of Covington

There are several coal mines in southwest Fountain County.

Townships

 Cain (July 24, 1826)
 Davis
 Fulton
 Jackson
 Logan
 Millcreek
 Richland (July 24, 1826)
 Shawnee (July 24, 1826)
 Troy (July 24, 1826)
 Van Buren
 Wabash (July 24, 1826)

Transportation

Highways
 runs east–west through the middle of Fountain County.  follows the same general east–west route of I-74 through the county; in the eastern part it runs on the south side of the interstate, but crosses to the north side between Veedersburg and Covington.  runs north–south through the county, passing through Attica and Veedersburg.

Three east–west state roads cross the county.  enters Attica from Warren County and crosses the north end of the county.  enters the middle of the county from Perrysville to the west and passes through Fountain County on its way to Crawfordsville to the east. , further to the south, enters from Cayuga to the west and passes east through Kingman. Two north–south state roads run through the county.  passes through Attica and shares the route of US Route 41 running goes south. At Rob Roy it turns to run southeast through Newton.  starts at State Road 28 in the north and runs south, ending at State Road 234.

Railroads
A Norfolk Southern Railway line crosses northern Fountain County on its route between Danville, Illinois and Lafayette, Indiana; it carries about 45 freight trains each day.

Air transportation
There are no public-use airports within the boundary of Fountain County; air service is available at nearby airports:
 Purdue University Airport - Indiana's second busiest airport, in Tippecanoe County, is operated by Purdue University.

Climate and weather

Fountain County is in the humid continental climate region of the United States along with most of Indiana. Its Köppen climate classification is Dfa, meaning that it is cold, has no dry season, and has a hot summer. Average monthly precipitation ranged from  inches in February to  inches in June.

From 1950 through 2009, six tornadoes were reported in Fountain County, causing $25 million in damage but no fatalities.

Education
Three public bodies administer Fountain County schools:
 Attica Consolidated School Corporation (northern Fountain County) – served 964 students during the 2009–2010 school year. It runs Attica Elementary and Attica Junior–Senior High Schools.
 Covington Community School Corporation (western Fountain County) – served 1,012 students during 2009–2010. It runs Covington Elementary, Covington Middle, and Covington High Schools.
 Southeast Fountain School Corporation (eastern Fountain County) – served 1,279 students during 2009–2010. It runs Southeast Fountain Elementary and Fountain Central Junior–Senior High Schools.

Notable people
Daniel Wolsey Voorhees was born in Ohio but was raised in Fountain County. He attended school in Veedersburg, graduated from college in 1849, was admitted to the bar, and began practicing law in Covington; he moved to Terre Haute in 1857. He served as a United States Senator (1877–1897), and was known as "the tall sycamore of the Wabash".  He died in Washington in 1897 and is buried in Terre Haute.

John Myers was born in Covington in 1927. He graduated from Covington High School, then from Indiana State University in Terre Haute; he served in the United States Army and then served in the US House of Representatives 1967–1997.

Government

The county government is a constitutional body granted specific powers by the Constitution of Indiana and the Indiana Code. The county council is the legislative branch of the county government and controls spending and revenue collection. Representatives are elected to four-year terms from county districts. The council members set salaries, the annual budget and special spending. The council has limited authority to impose local taxes, in the form of an income and property tax that is subject to state level approval, excise taxes and service taxes. In 2010, the county budgeted approximately $9.8 million for the district's schools and $3.2 million for other county operations and services, for a total annual budget of approximately $13 million.

A board of commissioners comprises the county's executive body. The commissioners are elected county-wide, in staggered four–year terms. One commissioner serves as president. The commissioners execute acts legislated by the council, collect revenue, and manage the county government.

The county maintains a circuit court. The judge on the court is elected to a term of six years and must be a lawyer admitted to practice law in Indiana.

The county has other elected offices, including sheriff, coroner, auditor, treasurer, recorder, and circuit court clerk. Each of these elected officers serves a term of four years and oversees a different part of county government. Members elected to county government positions are required to declare party affiliations and be residents of the county.

Each township has a trustee who administers rural fire protection and ambulance service, provides poor relief and manages cemetery care, among other duties. The trustee is assisted by a three-member township board. The trustees and board members are elected to four-year terms.

Based on the 2010 United States Census, Fountain County is part of Indiana's 4th congressional district; Indiana Senate district 23; and Indiana House of Representatives districts 13 and 42.

Demographics

2020 census
As of the 2020 United States Census there were 16,479 residents in Fountain County.

2010 Census
As of the 2010 United States Census, there were 17,240 people, 6,935 households, and 4,787 families in the county. The racial makeup of the county was 97.5% white, 0.2% black or African American, 0.3% Native American, 0.2% Asian, 0.0% Pacific Islander, 0.8% from other races, and 1.0% from two or more races. Those of Hispanic or Latino origin made up 2.2% of the population. In terms of ancestry, 21.6% were German, 14.4% were Irish, 14.3% were American, and 12.5% were English.

Of the 6,935 households, 31.2% had children under the age of 18 living with them, 54.7% were married couples living together, 10.0% had a female householder with no husband present, 31.0% were non-families, and 26.7% of all households were made up of individuals. The average household size was 2.46 and the average family size was 2.95. The median age was 41.6 years.

The median income for a household in the county was $47,697 and the median income for a family was $51,696. Males had a median income of $44,118 versus $28,462 for females. The per capita income for the county was $20,949. About 8.9% of families and 13.2% of the population were below the poverty line, including 18.8% of those under age 18 and 9.5% of those age 65 or over.

See also
 National Register of Historic Places listings in Fountain County, Indiana
 The Neighbor (newspaper)
 Western Indiana Community Foundation

Notes

References

Bibliography

External links

 
 Western Indiana Community Foundation
 Attica Consolidated School Corporation
 Covington Community School Corporation
 Southeast Fountain School Corporation
 Explore Fountain County

 
Indiana counties
1826 establishments in Indiana
Populated places established in 1826